The Waiheke Island wine region is a geographical indication and wine-growing region of New Zealand.

Background 

Waiheke Island is an island east of Auckland city in the Hauraki Gulf and is a geographical indication within the larger Auckland GI. It has a dry and warm mesoclimate, and is planted primarily in French red grape varieties: Syrah, Merlot, and Cabernet Sauvignon, as well as the white grape varieties Chardonnay and Pinot Gris. The Bordeaux style red wines that are produced are considered to be significantly ripe and full bodied, and some of the best in New Zealand. The Larose from Stonyridge Estate has an international reputation and is often compared with some of the best Bordeaux wine in the world, and comparing favourably with the likes of Château Latour and Château Mouton-Rothschild. Other notable wine producers are Destiny Bay Vineyards (Magna Praemia), Obsidian Vineyard, Peacock Sky, Man O'War (Dreadnought Syrah), Cable Bay, Mudbrick and Te Motu.

External links 
 Waiheke Island Wine (official site)

References 

Wine
Wine regions of New Zealand
Geography of Auckland